Scandinavian School of Brussels (SSB;) is an international school in Waterloo, Belgium. It serves students ages 2–19. The school has preschool through upper secondary levels, and has separate academic programmes for Denmark, Finland, Norway, and Sweden. SSB offers the International Baccalaureate (IB) Diploma Programme that is taught in more than 4000 schools in over 140 countries. Its French name refers to Queen Astrid of Sweden.

Its campus is located on the Argenteuil estate, which it shares with, "Den norske skolen i Brussel", the Queen Elisabeth Music Chapel, and the European School of Bruxelles-Argenteuil.

Campus and operations

SSB uses the following buildings:
 Main building - School administration, library, Preschool, levels 3-9 (compulsory education), upper secondary, and the gymnasium for students in levels 1-3
 Paviljong - The play area
 Compulsory FS-2 building - Houses the music area, the sports hall, and classrooms for compulsory levels FS-2
 Château d'Argenteuil - Used as the boarding facility and canteen

SSB also assigns some boarding students to area families who participate in homestay arrangements.

Student body
Its students originate from Denmark, Finland, Norway, and Sweden. As of 2015 it has about 300 students, most of whom reside in Waterloo, Lasne, and Sint-Genesius-Rode, with some living in central Brussels.

The school also offers home language courses to 100 other students.

Closure 
The school closed in 2020. It consolidated into the Swedish section of the European School of Bruxelles-Argenteuil.

References

External links

 Scandinavian School of Brussels

Buildings and structures in Walloon Brabant
International schools in Belgium
Secondary schools in Belgium
International Baccalaureate schools in Belgium
Swedish international schools
Norwegian international schools
Finnish international schools
Waterloo, Belgium
Norwegian diaspora in Europe